Generation EFX is the fourth studio album by American hip hop duo Das EFX. It was released on March 24, 1998 via EastWest Records America. Production was handled by Agallah, Solid Scheme, Rashad Smith, Mike Lowe, Tony L, and PMD, who also served as executive producer. Unlike the first three Das EFX albums, it features a number of guest appearances from Redman, Agallah, EPMD, Miss Jones, M.O.P., Nocturnal and Teflon. The album debuted and peaked at number 48 on the Billboard 200, selling 22,000 copies in its first week. In its second week of release, the album dropped to number 89 on the Billboard 200, selling 14,000 copies bringing the two week total to 36,000 copies.

Track listing

Personnel

Andre "Krazy Drayz" Weston – main artist
Willie "Skoob" Hines – main artist
Angel "8-Off Agallah" Aguilar – featured artist (track 4), producer (tracks: 2, 4, 14), co-producer (tracks: 8, 12)
Yasin "Nocturnal" Muhammedi – featured artist (track 4)
Eric "Billy Danze" Murray – featured artist (track 6)
Jamal "Lil' Fame" Grinnage – featured artist (track 6)
Linwood "Teflon" Starling – featured artist (track 6)
Reginald "Redman" Noble – featured artist (tracks: 7, 15)
Parrish "PMD" Smith – featured artist (track 8), producer (tracks: 8, 10, 12, 13, 15), co-producer (track 7), executive producer
Erick Sermon – featured artist (track 8)
Tarsha "Miss" Jones – featured artist (track 10)
Chris Charity – producer (tracks: 2, 6, 11)
Derek Lynch – producer (tracks: 2, 6, 11)
Tony L. Williams – producer (track 3)
Rashad Smith – producer (tracks: 5, 7)
Michael "Mike Loe" Lowe – producer (track 9)
Armando Colon – co-producer (tracks: 5, 7)
Charlie Marotta – co-producer (track 12), engineering, mixing
Eliud "Lou" Ortiz – engineering, mixing
Tom Ciante – engineering
John Decatur – engineering
Bob Fudjinski – engineering
Dave Greenberg – engineering
Paul Gregory – engineering
Ivan "Doc" Rodriguez – mixing
Greg Burke – art direction, design
Danny Clinch – photography
Agnes Cammock – styling

Charts

References

External links

1998 albums
Das EFX albums
East West Records albums
Albums produced by Agallah
Albums produced by Rashad Smith